Wangerooge Airfield, German: Flugplatz Wangerooge , is a small airfield in Wangerooge, Lower Saxony, Germany.

Airlines and destinations
The following airlines offer regular scheduled and charter flights at Wangerooge Airfield:

References

External links

 Official website

Buildings and structures in Lower Saxony
Wangerooge
Airports in Lower Saxony